Bellevue Airfield (BVU) was a private airfield in the northwest United States, located in what is now the Eastgate Neighborhood of Bellevue, Washington, a suburb east of Seattle. It was situated east of 156th Avenue SE and north of Interstate 90 near Phantom Lake. Part of the airport's land was used as a landfill from 1951 till 1964, and featured a landfill gas venting system. Closed in 1983, today the area is an office park.

When the LDS Seattle Washington Temple opened in 1980, the airfield was still in operation and the temple spire included a strobe light.

Sometime after the airport closed, a new heliport was added at the north end of runway named Bellevue Business Park Boeing Company Services Headquarters Heliport with the designation of 71WA. It was reportedly used as a private heliport for the nearby Boeing Eastgate campus. The heliport was closed and the final visible remnants of the north end of the old runway were removed during construction of the Advanta Office Commons buildings leased by Microsoft. The disused heliport is still visible and is occasionally used as a basketball court.

The remaining 27 acres north of the Advanta Office Commons was sold to City of Bellevue from Boeing who plans on developing it into Bellevue Airfield Park. However, design and construction is expected to take some time as renovation of the landfill gas system is required. Boeing sold the remainder of its Eastgate Office Park in 2021 and is expected to leave the campus entirely by 2023. 

The only remnants still visible is the heliport and the red and white lamp posts with two red strobe lights on top situated on the nearby overpasses to the south.

References

External links
History of airfield with photos at the Abandoned & Little-Known Airfields site.
Aerial photo of airfield in 1969 at Seattle Times Eastside News
Pictures of the old airstrip and helipad before the Advanta Office Commons buildings leased by Microsoft were constructed

Airports in King County, Washington
Defunct airports in Washington (state)